Galaksija was a monthly magazine for popularization of science and science fiction that was published in Yugoslavia from 1972 to the 1990s by BIGZ. Its headquarters was in Belgrade.

The Računari computer magazine was initially a special edition of Galaksija in December 1983.

Another project launched by the magazine was the Galaksija home computer constructed by Voja Antonić. Its do-it-yourself schematics were first published by Galaksija.

Editors
1972-1987 Gavrilo Vučković
1987-1989 Stanko M. Stojiljković
1989-1991 Aleksandar Petrović
1991-1995 Rade Grujić
1995-2001 Borislav Soleša

References

External links
Gallery: Galaksija Magazine's Balkan Futurism at PopSci

1972 establishments in Yugoslavia
Defunct magazines published in Yugoslavia
Magazines established in 1972
Magazines disestablished in 2001
Mass media in Belgrade
Monthly magazines
Popular science magazines
Serbian-language magazines
Yugoslav science fiction
Eastern Bloc mass media